Leandro Silva may refer to:

Leandro Silva (fighter) (born 1985), Brazilian MMA fighter
Leandro Silva (equestrian) (born 1976), Brazilian Olympic equestrian
Leandro Silva (footballer, born 1986), Brazilian footballer born Leandro Paulino Da Silva
Leandro Silva (footballer, born 1988), Brazilian footballer born Leandro da Silva
Leandro Silva (footballer, born 1994), Portuguese footballer born Leandro Miguel Pereira da Silva
Leandro Silva (footballer, born 1995), Portuguese footballer born Leandro Xavier Marques Silva
Leandro Silva (footballer, born 1999), Brazilian footballer born Leandro da Silva Alves

See also
Leandro da Silva (disambiguation)
Leandro Almeida Silva (footballer, born 1977), Brazilian footballer